Saturday Night at the Blue Note is a 1990 live album by Oscar Peterson.

Track listing
 "Kelly's Blues" – 11:57
 "Nighttime" – 10:11
 Medley: "Love Ballade"/"If You Only Knew" – 10:57
 "You Look Good to Me" (Seymour Lefco, Clement Wells) – 6:39
 "Old Folks" (Dedette Lee Hill, Willard Robison) – 6:43
 "Reunion Blues" (Milt Jackson) – 7:17
 "Song to Elitha" – 11:51

All tracks composed by Oscar Peterson, unless otherwise noted.

Personnel

Performance
 Oscar Peterson – piano
 Herb Ellis – guitar
 Ray Brown – double bass
 Bobby Durham - drums

Production
 Donald Elfman - liner notes
 Kenneth Harmann - engineer
 Jack Renner
 Robert Woods - producer

References

Oscar Peterson live albums
1990 live albums
Telarc Records live albums
Grammy Award for Best Jazz Instrumental Album
Albums recorded at the Blue Note Jazz Club